Odin Township may refer to the following townships in the United States:

 Odin Township, Marion County, Illinois
 Odin Township, Watonwan County, Minnesota